KZWB (97.9 FM) is a radio station broadcasting from Green River, Wyoming. The station signed on June 1, 2005. KZWB is owned by Wagonwheel Communications Corporation, who also owns KUGR and KZWB's two sister stations KYCS and KFRZ.

KZWB specializes in a classic hits music format that plays music from primarily the 1960s, and 1970s, but occasionally plays music from the 1980s.

Signal
KZWB, like its sister stations, broadcasts from Wilkins Peak just outside Rock Springs, Wyoming in Sweetwater County. The station shares tower space with KFRZ and transmits a 10,500 watt signal to protect KBZN in Utah. The signal reaches the majority of Sweetwater County, and begins to weaken near Rawlins to the east, and Mountain View to the west. The signal reaches into parts of northeastern Utah, and as far north as Pinedale.

References

External links

ZWB(FM)
Classic hits radio stations in the United States
Green River, Wyoming
Sweetwater County, Wyoming
1972 establishments in Wyoming
Radio stations established in 2005